Haralson is a surname. Notable people with the name include:

Hugh A. Haralson (1805–1854), American politician
Jeremiah Haralson (1846 – c. 1916), American politician
Jonathan Haralson (1830–1912), American judge
Parys Haralson (1984–2021), American football player
Phil Haralson (1851–1934), American lawyer

See also
Haraldsson, surname
Harrelson, surname